Events from the year 1928 in France.

Incumbents
President: Gaston Doumergue 
President of the Council of Ministers: Raymond Poincaré

Events
22 April – Legislative Election held.
29 April – Legislative Election held.
7 July – The French government issues an order limiting the list of private radio stations permitted to continue broadcasting.
27 August – The Kellogg–Briand Pact is signed in Paris – the first treaty which outlaws aggressive war.

Sport
17 June – Tour de France begins.
15 July – Tour de France ends, won by Nicolas Frantz of Luxembourg.

Births

January to June
4 January – Maurice Rigobert Marie-Sainte, Martinique Roman Catholic clergyman (died 2017)
6 January – Capucine, actress (died 1990)
11 January – Andréa Guiot, soprano (died 2021)
17 January – Jean Barraqué, composer (died 1973)
23 January – Jeanne Moreau, film actress (died 2017)
24 January – Michel Serrault, actor (died 2007)
26 January – Roger Vadim, film director (died 2000)
10 February – Jean-Luc Lagardère, engineer and businessman (died 2003)
23 February – André Strappe, international soccer player (died 2006)
1 March – Jacques Rivette, filmmaker (died 2016)
3 March – Pierre Michelot, double bass player (died 2005)
2 April – Serge Gainsbourg, poet, singer-songwriter, actor and director (died 1991)
12 April – Jean-François Paillard, conductor (died 2013)
28 April – Yves Klein, painter (died 1962)
2 May – Georges-Arthur Goldschmidt, French writer, German translator 
3 May – Jacques-Louis Lions, mathematician (died 2001)
5 May – Jacques Médecin, politician (died 1998)
28 May – André Schwarz-Bart, novelist (died 2006)
29 June – Jean-Louis Pesch, writer
30 June – Nathaniel Tarn, poet, essayist, anthropologist and translator

July to December
2 July – Line Renaud, actress
3 July – Georges-Jean Arnaud, author (died 2020)
6 July – Bernard Malgrange, mathematician
10 July – Bernard Buffet, painter (died 1999)
13 July – Jeanne Loriod, musician (died 2001)
26 July – Elliott Erwitt, French-American photographer and director 
30 July – Paul Bisciglia, film actor (died 2010)
2 August – Yoko Tani, French-born Japanese actress and nightclub entertainer (died 1999
)
6 August
 Jean-Christophe Averty, television and radio director (died 2017)
 Michel Clouscard, Marxist philosopher and sociologist (died 2009) 
Jean Carrière, writer (died 2005)
14 August
 Jacques Rouffio, film director and screenwriter (died 2016)
 Joëlle Bernard, film and television actress (died 1977)
21 September – Édouard Glissant, writer, poet and literary critic (died 2011)
27 September – Elizabeth F. Neufeld, French-born American geneticist 
3 October – Christian d'Oriola, Olympic gold medal-winning foil fencer (died 2007)
23 October – Marthe Mercadier, actress (died 2021)
31 October – Jean-François Deniau, statesman, diplomat, essayist and novelist (died 2007)
13 November – Michel Gauquelin, psychologist and statistician (died 1991)
17 November – Arman, artist (died 2005)
2 December – Guy Bourdin, photographer (died 1991)
30 December – Christian Millau, food critic and author (died 2017)
31 December – Siné, cartoonist (died 2016)

Full date unknown
Janine Chasseguet-Smirgel, psychoanalyst (died 2006)
Jean-Jacques Millant, bow maker (died 1998)
Jacques Poirier, painter (died 2002)

Deaths
2 January – Yves du Manoir, rugby player (born 1904; air crash)
11 February – Émile Basly, miner and trade unionist (born 1854)
22 February – Yves Guyot, politician and economist (born 1843)
7 March – Jules Auguste Lemire, priest and social reformer (born 1853)
28 July – Édouard-Henri Avril, painter and commercial artist (born 1843)
September – Paul Ferrier, dramatist (born 1843)
8 September – Jean Bourdeau, writer (born 1848)
23 October – François Victor Alphonse Aulard, historian (born 1849)
18 December
Louis-Anne-Jean Brocq, dermatologist (born 1856)
Lucien Capet, violinist and composer (born 1873)
23 December – Georges Destenave, explorer (born 1854)

Full date unknown
Achille Maffre de Baugé, poet (born 1855)

See also
 List of French films of 1928

References

1920s in France